Rafael Anibal Montiel Cuéllar (born June 28, 1981 in El Bagre) is a Colombian professional road cyclist, who last rode for UCI Continental team . On 29 April 2015, Montiel won the opening stage of the Tour of the Gila, after catching the breakaway on the slopes of the last climb and soloing to the mountaintop finish.

Major results

2006
 9th Overall Clásico Ciclístico Banfoandes
2007
 1st Stage 13 Vuelta a Colombia
 2nd Overall Vuelta a Guatemala
1st Stage 5
 3rd Overall Vuelta a Cundinamarca
 10th Overall Vuelta a El Salvador
1st Stage 9
2008
 1st Stage 6 Vuelta a Colombia
2009
 2nd Overall Clásica de Soacha 
 2nd Overall Vuelta a Santander 
1st Stage 2
 3rd Overall Vuelta al Ecuador
2010
 1st Stage 1 (TTT) Vuelta a Colombia
 8th Overall Vuelta a Guatemala
1st Stage 4
2011
 1st Stage 2a (TTT) Vuelta a Colombia
 1st  Mountains classification USA Pro Cycling Challenge
2013
 1st Stage 5 Vuelta a Colombia
2014
 8th Overall Vuelta a Guatemala
2015
 1st Stage 1 Tour of the Gila

See also
 List of doping cases in cycling

References

External links

 

1981 births
Living people
Sportspeople from Bogotá
Colombian male cyclists
Vuelta a Colombia stage winners
Doping cases in cycling
Colombian sportspeople in doping cases
21st-century Colombian people